Blue Like Jazz is a 2012 American comedy-drama film directed by Steve Taylor and starring Marshall Allman, Claire Holt, and Tania Raymonde. It is based on Donald Miller's semi-autobiographical book of the same name. Miller, Taylor, and Ben Pearson co-wrote the screenplay.

Cast
 Marshall Allman as Donald "Don" Miller
 Claire Holt as Penny
 Jason Marsden as Kenny
 Tania Raymonde as Lauryn
 Eric Lange as The Hobo
 Justin Welborn as The Pope
 Natalia Dyer as Grace

Production
Steve Taylor pitched the film to investors for four years until two investors, one from Seattle and one from Los Angeles, agreed to sign on for $250,000 each. The day before pre-production, the Los Angeles investor backed out and the film was scratched. When Donald Miller posted on his personal blog that the film was to be cancelled, however, two readers from Tennessee announced that they would raise the remaining required funds by way of the Kickstarter website.

According to Yancey Strickler, one of the founders of Kickstarter, only six films have ever raised more than $100,000 through the website as of May 2011. Taylor didn't believe that this fundraising effort would work, so he agreed to personally call and thank every donator of more than $10 if they met the target goal of $125,000. By October 2010, $345,992 had been donated through the website towards the film. Considering so much money had been raised through Kickstarter, the backer from Seattle matched that amount and contributed even more. Taylor was able to shoot the film for $750,000 and have an extra $500,000 left for post-production.

By May 2011, Taylor had personally called and thanked half of the 3,300 people who donated more than $10 through Kickstarter. He had called the remainder by April 2012. Blue Like Jazz: The Movie was the second most successful Kickstarter fundraiser in 2010.

Miller's 2009 book A Million Miles in a Thousand Years is based on his experience of revising his memoir into the screenplay for this film.

Filming took place in Nashville, Tennessee and Portland, Oregon.

Release
The film had its world premiere as an official selection of the South by Southwest Film Festival on March 13, 2012. It was released in theaters on April 13, 2012 through Roadside Attractions. It was released on DVD and Blu-ray on August 7, 2012 in the United States and Canada.

References

External links
 
 
 
 
 
 

2012 films
2012 comedy-drama films
American biographical films
American comedy-drama films
Films about Christianity
Films about writers
Films based on biographies
Films set in Portland, Oregon
Films shot in Portland, Oregon
Films set in the 1990s
Films shot in Tennessee
American independent films
Kickstarter-funded films
Roadside Attractions films
2012 comedy films
2012 independent films
2010s English-language films
Films directed by Steve Taylor
2010s American films